The Australia women's national cricket team toured New Zealand in January 1986. They played against New Zealand in three One Day Internationals, which were competed for the Rose Bowl. The series was drawn 1–1 after the final match ended as a no result due to rain.

Squads

WODI Series

1st ODI

2nd ODI

3rd ODI

References

External links
Australia Women tour of New Zealand 1985/86 from Cricinfo

Women's international cricket tours of New Zealand
1986 in New Zealand cricket
Australia women's national cricket team tours